Francis Lyons  may refer to:

 Francis Lyons (1798–1862), Member of Parliament for Cork
F. S. L. Lyons (1923–1983) (Francis S.L. Lyons), Irish historian
Frank Lyons (1954-present) (Francis R. Lyons), American Anglican bishop

See also
Francis Lyon (disambiguation)
Lyons (surname)